Le Testament is a collection of poetry composed in 1461 by François Villon. Le Testament, comprising over twenty essentially independent poems in octosyllabic verse, consists of a series of fixed-form poems, namely 16 ballades and three rondeaux, and is recognized as a gem of medieval literature.

Analysis 

The 2,023 lines of the Testament are marked by the immediate prospect of death by hanging and frequently describe other forms of misery and death. It mixes reflections on the passing of time, bitter derision, invective, and religious fervor. This mixed tone of tragic sincerity stands in contrast to the other poets of the time.

In one of these poems, Ballade des dames du temps jadis ("Ballad of the Ladies of Times Past"), each stanza and the concluding envoi asks after the fate of various celebrated women, including Héloise and Joan of Arc, and ends with the same semi-ironic question:

This same "Ballade des dames du temps jadis" was famously translated into English in 1870 by Dante Gabriel Rossetti as "Ballade of Dead Ladies". Rossetti translated the refrain as "But where are the snows of yester-year?"

Poems 
Poems included in Le Testament are:

 Ballade des dames du temps jadis (1458–59) (see also main article: Ballade des dames du temps jadis)
 Ballade des seigneurs du temps jadis
 Ballade en vieux language françois
 Les regrets de la belle Heaulmiere
 Ballade de la Belle Heaulmière aux filles de joie
 Double ballade sur le mesme propos
 Ballade pour prier Nostre Dame
 Ballade à s'amie
 Lay ou rondeau
 Ballade pour Jean Cotart
 Ballade pour Robert d'Estouteville
 Ballade des langues ennuieuses
 Les Contredits de Franc Gontier
 Ballade des femmes de Paris
 Ballade de la Grosse Margot
 Belle leçon aux enfants perdus
 Ballade de bonne doctrine
 Rondeau ou bergeronnette
 Épitaphe
 Rondeau
 Ballade de conclusion

See also 

 Ballade des pendus
 Poetical testament
 Neuss Testament

References

External links 
 Complete works at Project Gutenberg
 François Villon: Poems, translated by David Georgi

French poetry collections
French poems
Medieval literature
15th century in France
15th-century poems
Poetry by François Villon